The Abbé Pierre de Porcaro (August 1904 – 12 March 1945) was a French Roman Catholic priest who worked as an undercover minister during the Second World War. He was eventually captured by the Nazis and died in Dachau concentration camp.

Life

Early life
Pierre de Porcaro was born to a long-established Breton family in Dinan, Brittany, in August 1904. He was ordained to the priesthood at Versailles in 1929, and worked at the seminary there as a master of Roman history. In 1935 he became the vicar of Saint-Germain-en-Laye, outside Paris, where he was particularly known for his work with Catholic youth groups.

The Second World War
De Porcaro was called up when war broke out in 1939, and he was captured, along with the rest of his unit, during the Battle for France in June 1940. He was originally sent to Stalag IX-B as a prisoner of war, but was subsequently released as "clean" in August 1941. Returning to Saint-Germain, he continued his work as a local priest until 1943, when the Bishop of Versailles, Monsignor Roland-Gosselin, asked him to travel to Germany and minister clandestinely to French forced labourers. Catholic priests were under great danger in Germany, but de Porcaro accepted the mission, writing:

Accepting the mission, he travelled to Germany as part of the Service du travail obligatoire programme, by which Vichy France provided thousands of French workers to Nazi Germany as forced labour. De Porcaro worked at a cardboard factory in Dresden during the day, and pursued his ministry by night, when he held popular masses in secret, with the complicity of a local German priest. He wore a special scouting belt around his waist as a sign to other French workers that he was secretly a priest. His cover was blown, though, after a written denunciation by a fellow Frenchman, and he was arrested in September 1944, and eventually, in January 1945, sent to Dachau concentration camp, where he was interned in a block filled with other Catholic priests.

Death
Conditions in the camp were deteriorating at this point in the war, and disease was a serious problem. De Porcaro contracted typhus in February (almost certainly from ministering to sick Frenchmen in the camp), and ultimately died of the disease on 12 March 1945, just over a month before the camp was liberated by the American army.

Legacy
The seminary buildings of Versailles are named after him (the Maisons Pierre de Porcaro), and the current bishop of Versailles, Monsignor Éric Aumonier, has initiated plans to have de Porcaro beatified. There is also a commemorative statue of him in Saint-Germain-en-Laye.

References

20th-century French Roman Catholic priests
French people who died in Dachau concentration camp
People from Dinan
1904 births
1945 deaths
French Resistance members
Resistance members who died in Nazi concentration camps